Wiener Neustadt, a city in Austria, was the target of bombing raids during World War II by the Allies.

Background
The targets in and around Wiener Neustadt included the marshalling yards, the Wiener Neustädter Flugzeugwerke (WNF) aircraft factory (effectively an extension of Messerschmitt) and the Raxwerke plants of Wiener Neustädter Lokomotivfabrik (two of which used  forced labor from the Mauthausen-Gusen concentration camp).

The three WNF plants (W.N.F. Fischamend, W.N.F. Klagenfurt, W.N.F. Bad Vöslau) were targets of the Combined Bomber Offensive against the German aircraft industry. WNF manufactured Messerschmitt Bf 109 fighters and repaired Junkers bombers and heavy fighters .  
The Hirtenberger Patronen Zündhütchen und Metallwarenfabrik was an ammunition factory nearby.

References

Wiener Neustadt
Wiener Neustadt
Wiener Neustadt